Same Girl is the fifth studio album by Christian singer-songwriter Twila Paris, released in 1987 by Star Song Records. Paris was nominated in two categories at the 19th GMA Dove Awards for Female Vocalist of the Year and Pop/Contemporary Album of the Year for Same Girl. Christian recording artist and guitar player Phil Keaggy provides an acoustic guitar solo on the track "I Feel It." The album peaked at number six on the Billboard Top Inspirational Albums chart.

Track listing  
All songs written by Twila Paris.
"Holy is the Lord" - 3:25
"Bonded Together" - 4:56
"Running to the Rescue - 3:22
"Send Me" - 4:42
"Same Girl" - 4:23
"Prince of Peace" - 4:34
"Let No Man Take Your Crown" - 3:32
"I Feel It" - 4:14
"Throne Room Suite" - 7:38

Personnel 
 Twila Paris – lead vocals, backing vocals (1, 2)
 Carl Marsh – keyboards, Fairlight programming, track arrangements, string arrangements (1, 5, 6, 9)
 Eric Persing – additional synthesizers (4, 8)
 Rhett Lawrence – Fairlight percussion (6), additional synthesizers (9)
 Hadley Hockensmith – guitars (1-4, 6, 7, 9)
 Don Potter – acoustic guitar (1, 5, 9)
 Michael Demus – guitars (5, 6, 8)
 Phil Keaggy – acoustic guitar solo (8)
 Abraham Laboriel – bass (1-4, 6-9)
 Mike Brignardello – bass (5)
 Keith Edwards – drums 
 Carl Gorodetzky – string concertmaster (1, 5, 6, 9)
 Nashville String Machine – strings (1, 5, 6, 9)
 Matthew Ward – backing vocals (1, 3, 5, 7)
 Jonathan David Brown – backing vocals (2)
 Greg X. Volz – backing vocals (4, 9)
 Ava Aldridge – backing vocals (6, 9)
 Lenny LeBlanc – backing vocals (6, 9)
 Cindy Richardson – backing vocals (6, 9)
 Kelly Willard – backing vocals (7), harmony vocals (8)
 Angie Paris – backing vocals (9)
 Starla Paris – backing vocals (9)
 Oren Paris – backing vocals (9)

Production
 Jonathan David Brown – producer, recording, mixing 
 Joe Baldridge – engineer 
 Kevin Burns – engineer 
 J.T. Cantwell – engineer 
 Mike Clute – engineer 
 Steve Ford – engineer 
 Lynn Fuston – engineer 
 Danny Johnson – engineer 
 Billy Whittington – engineer 
 Jack W. Ross – studio manager for The Bennett House 
 Wendy Holt – production manager 
 Kelly McBryde – production manager 
 Teri Piro – production manager 
 Steve Schaffer – production manager 
 Ken Wolgemuth – art direction 
 Charlie Freeman – photography 
 Jack Wright – personal management

Critical reception 
Ashleigh Kittle of AllMusic has reviewed Same Girl and said that "it is characteristic of her work during the mid- to late 1980s. She carefully blends a combination of inspirational CCM and praise and worship to create a project that contains its upbeat moments, yet doesn't quite fit the CCM or adult contemporary mold."

Charts

Radio singles

References 

1987 albums
Twila Paris albums